The 3rd Plurinational Legislative Assembly of Bolivia (ALP) is the current meeting of the legislative branch of the Bolivian government, composed of the Chamber of Senators and the Chamber of Deputies. It convened in La Paz on 3 November 2020, during the final week of Jeanine Áñez's presidency, and will end in 2025. It will meet during all five years of Luis Arce's presidency.

The 2020 general elections decided control of both chambers. In both the Chamber of Deputies and Senate, the Movement for Socialism retained its majority—albeit reduced from the two-thirds supermajority from the 2nd Plurinational Legislative Assembly. This assembly marks the first time women make up the majority of the legislature as a whole at 51.9 percent of parliamentarians. In the Senate, women make up the absolute majority at 55.5 percent of senators, while in the Chamber of Deputies, they reach near gender parity at 46.9 percent of deputies.

This legislature has been characterized by frequent inter-party conflicts and quarrels. The ruling Movement for Socialism failed to attain a supermajority in either chamber—as it had done in the previous assemblies—granting the opposition a higher degree of discretion over decisions requiring the support of two-thirds of legislators. However, amendments to the regulations of both chambers approved by the preceding legislature shortly before this assembly's formal installation abrogated the two-thirds requirement for numerous parliamentary procedures, leading political analysts to note the effective neutralization of the opposition's ability to operate. Subsequent disputes and accusations by the opposition of abuse of parliamentary procedure purportedly perpetrated by the ruling party have resulted in disorderly behavior and even physical violence during legislative sessions regarding the election of members to commissions and the passage of controversial bills.

History

Two-thirds controversy 
Though the Movement for Socialism (MAS-IPSP) achieved a first-round victory in the 2020 general elections, winning absolute majorities in both the Senate—nineteen seats—and Chamber of Deputies—sixty-six seats—the party fell just shy of attaining a supermajority of two-thirds of the legislators in either chamber, as it had done in the two previous legislative terms. In the Senate, the MAS won twenty-one seats, three short of the twenty-four necessary to achieve a two-thirds majority in that chamber, and in the lower house, it won seventy-five seats; eighty-seven deputies are required to reach a supermajority in the Chamber of Deputies, leaving the MAS twelve seats short. In total, of the 166 seats making up both chambers, the MAS held ninety-six, leaving it fourteen behind of the 110 votes necessary to attain two-thirds in a plenary session. As a result, the MAS was placed in a situation in which it would be forced to negotiate with the opposition on matters requiring two-thirds of the assembly's support, a fact that had not been the case for over a decade, since the opening of the 2010–2015 legislature in January 2010. Political Scientist Franklin Pareja noted that, without two-thirds, the MAS would no longer be able to circumvent legislative debate and pass laws without discussing with the opposition, as it had grown accustomed to doing in previous years. For Pareja, this would hopefully provide for a "healthier" legislature.

In this context, a major controversy arose when on 27 and 28 October 2020, both chambers in the outgoing assembly used the final hours of their term to amend the articles of their general regulations, eliminating the two-thirds threshold for measures such as the modification of parliamentary committees, the agenda for sessions, promotions of certain public and military officials, and the appointment of ambassadors, reducing the requirement to a simple majority. However, measures requiring two-thirds of both chambers as established by the Constitution, such as the appointment of the prosecutor general, the ombudsman, the comptroller, or members of the Supreme Electoral Tribunal, remained unchanged.

Outgoing Senator Ciro Zabala (MAS) explained the new rules as "an administrative change" meant to push aside "obstacles" to Luis Arce's mandate. For his part, President-elect Arce endorsed the move, stating that "what our Assembly has done is maintain legality... and there should be no concern". Nonetheless, the opposition denounced the change. Outgoing Deputy Shirley Franco called it "an affront to democracy. They eliminate the two-thirds to nullify the opposition". At the same time, Carlos Mesa, leader of Civic Community (CC), decried the rule change as an "unacceptable and illegitimate maneuver". Similarly, Creemos leader Luis Fernando Camacho characterized the regulatory amendment as an "outrage", stating: "the MAS will never leave behind its dictatorial impulse". Newspaper Página Siete reported that, in this way, "[the] MAS [has] neutralize[d] the opposition for five years", primarily due to the fact that the ruling party was now capable of closing legislative debate by a simple majority. Political analyst Williams Bascopé also noted that the MAS' ability to change the legislative agenda at will provided for the possibility of opposition legislators entering the assembly without being informed of what would be discussed in that session.

At Arce's inauguration, Mesa and the entire CC caucus left the hemicycle of the Plurinational Legislative Assembly in protest prior to the end of the ceremony. In a press conference, Mesa announced CC's intent to file an appeal with the Plurinational Constitutional Court (TCP), demanding the unconstitutionality of the annulment of the two-thirds requirement. Three days later, the alliance formally presented the TCP with an appeal containing the signatures of all fifty CC legislators. In late November, the TCP rejected the motion on technical grounds, arguing that the coalition had not gone through the proper legal channels in the Legislative Assembly before bringing their case to the court. Two separate appeals filed by Creemos were also declared inadmissible by the TCP. Creemos Senator Centa Rek denounced that the court's rulings demonstrated its "absolute submission" before the government.

New assembly building 

This legislative session saw the completion and inauguration of a new Plurinational Assembly headquarters to replace the previous Legislative Palace. The decision to establish a new building was sanctioned by Law N° 313, which also authorized the erection of a new executive building, the Casa Grande del Pueblo, completed in 2018. Construction began in 2016 under the charge of the firm Asociación Accidental Constructoras Bolivianas (CONSTRUBOL). By the end, the total State investment in the project amounted to Bs473.2 million.

The new legislature covers 44,000m2 with nine underground levels and twenty above-ground floors, allowing it to be seen from anywhere in La Paz and El Alto. It is topped by a cubic structure containing the hemicycle of the Chamber of Senators on levels fourteen and fifteen and the Chamber of Deputies on levels seventeen through twenty. The cube measures a length of thirty-six meters, meant to represent the thirty-six nationally recognized indigenous nations. Additionally, the various offices and corridors are adorned with motifs and artwork from all of these groups.

The new building was inaugurated on 2 August 2020 with the presence of the president, vice president, and most legislators of the ruling party. In his speech, President Arce declared that the legislature symbolized "a new stage" in the country's history. Vice President David Choquehuanca pointed to its establishment as a measure of "decolonized thinking" in the country. Likewise, President of the Chamber of Deputies Freddy Mamani stated that, with the inauguration of the new infrastructure, Bolivia entered a new era, definitively leaving behind the Republic of Bolivia that was superseded by the Plurinational State through the passage of the 2009 Constitution.

Neither CC nor Creemos participated in the inauguration of the new building. In a statement, CC characterized its establishment as "an affront to the country" that wastes economic resources in the midst of a health crisis in order to "satisfy the megalomania of Evo Morales". Senator Rek stated that the decision of its caucus not to attend was due to the fact it had "nothing to celebrate... because we are cut in our rights and legislative functions, and they do not allow us to participate and influence the laws that are approved".

Defection in the opposition

Ethics Commission I 

While the MAS lay three votes away from reaching two-thirds in the Senate, the daily El Deber noted that swaying that many opposition senators to break ranks would be "almost impossible". However, in the Chamber of Deputies, with its larger pool of possible defectors, the situation was different. Outgoing Deputy Amílcar Barral stated that, while it would be difficult, he "would not be surprised if... some legislators from Civic Community and Creemos... betray their parties and go to support the MAS". He pointed out that this had previously occurred with some senators and deputies in the previous two assemblies.

The first instance of such an occurrence came on 28 January 2021, when Edwin Bazán, head of the Creemos caucus in the Chamber of Deputies, announced the alliance's expulsion of four of its deputies—Tito Caero, Runy Callaú, Sandra Paz, and Omar Rueda—for what he described as "moral turpitude". The decision came due to the events of a month prior, in which the four expelled deputies presented Rueda as a nominee to the Ethics Commission against Bazán, who was nominated by the rest of the Creemos caucus. With MAS support, Rueda was elected to the commission, while Bazán was not taken into account. Bazán denounced that, in this way, the MAS achieved a majority on the commission, with three of its own deputies and one dissident to the two of CC, a fact he indicated they would use to intimidate the opposition with sanctions and legal processes. As a result, Bazán announced his alliance's intent to file a lawsuit with the Supreme Electoral Tribunal (TSE) for political transfuge in order to regain the seat. In response, Rueda affirmed that neither he nor his compatriots were allied to the MAS but that they did not hold "favoritism to anyone". He further outlined that his expulsion was not valid because Creemos was not a national political party but, instead, remained a political alliance and, as such, did not have registered members to expel. MAS Deputy Estefanía Morales pointed out that Bazán himself and other Creemos deputies had run in the annulled 2019 elections as members of CC and later joined Creemos for the 2020 election. She went on to characterize the alliance's disagreements as "internal issues that must be resolved in their caucus".  On 1 February 2022, the TSE rejected Creemos' complaint.

All of the defecting parliamentarians represent Santa Cruz and are members of Solidarity Civic Unity (UCS), a component party of the Creemos alliance that supported the presidential campaign of Camacho in 2020 and is led by Santa Cruz Mayor Jhonny Fernández. They make up the entire bloc of UCS members that were elected as titular deputies alongside four substitute deputies and one substitute senator—Fernández's daughter, Paola—as representatives of the party. Creemos Deputy José Carlos Gutiérrez of Santa Cruz contended that the strategy of the MAS was to achieve the suspension of four incumbents in order to allow their UCS substitutes to take the seats. On 6 November, one of these substitute deputies, José Luis Durán, also broke with Creemos and joined the ranks of the dissidents. With the departure of five legislators from UCS, criticism was raised against Fernández. In response, the Santa Cruz mayor assured that he has "no alliance with the MAS" but also, with the elections over, "no alliance with Creemos" either. In terms of the disunity in Creemos, he qualified Camacho as wholly responsible as party leader for any disagreements within his organization.

Chamber of Deputies Directorate I 

Tensions over the defection of opposition legislators came to a head in November 2021 on the occasion of the renewal of the Chamber of Deputies' directorate, a body made up of the president, first and second vice presidents, and first through fourth secretaries, of which the second vice presidency and third and fourth secretariats correspond to the opposition as outlined in the chamber's general regulations. On behalf of CC, Carlos Alarcón announced Enrique Urquidi and Walter Villagra, respectively, as their nominees for second vice president and third secretary. However, on 6 November, CC faced an internal crisis when two of its deputies, Edwin Rosas and Keyla Ortiz, declared themselves candidates for these positions. Additionally, the four Creemos dissidents rejected their caucus' nomination of Oscar Michel to the fourth secretariat, instead promoting the continuation of incumbent secretary Sandra Paz in the position. Amid threats and shouts, chamber president Freddy Mamani delayed the vote in order to allow the opposition to reach a consensus.

As the opposition handled its most recent crisis, similar fissures occurred within the MAS caucus, though to a lesser extent. Though Mamani sought a second term as president of the lower house, he failed to attain the nomination of the MAS' La Paz caucus, with Hernán Durán winning the vote by a margin of twenty-five to sixteen. However, Durán's nomination faced pushback from representatives of other departments, with MAS legislators from Beni, Chuquisaca, Pando, and Tarija coalescing around Jerges Mercado, who was nominated by the Santa Cruz caucus. Unlike the opposition, however, the MAS' disagreements remained internal, with Mamani being ratified as a consensus candidate.

While the MAS managed to resolve its disagreements semi-magnanimously, the opposition's disputes continued much more openly, with CC electing to publicly expel both defecting deputies from its ranks. In order to block the election, rescheduled for the morning of 7 November, the opposition held a vigil in the Chamber of Deputies the night prior. To circumvent this, the MAS moved its members to the former Legislative Palace—out of use since the inauguration of a new headquarters in August—and installed the session without the presence of the opposition. Amid protests, Mamani granted the minority parties a twenty-five-minute stay, after which the session began again with their presence. In what Opinión described as "embarrassing" and Los Tiempos called a "scandal", the directive elections were carried out on 7 November. The vote took place amid an atmosphere of screams, insults, pushing, and shoving; at one point, deputies poured water on each other while others tore up their ballots denouncing a "legislative coup". The final result was the reelection of Mamani to the presidency of the Chamber of Deputies, with MAS deputies taking the first vice presidency and first and second secretariats. The dissident Rosas was elected second vice president while Paz continued as fourth secretary. Ortiz was not chosen, with the position of third secretary being granted to Villagra, allowing for one opposition deputy in the chamber's directive. Why the MAS elected to ratify Villagra as third secretary was never clarified.
With the effective adhesion of two deputies from CC and four from Creemos, the MAS now requires eight parliamentarians to reach two-thirds in the assembly: five deputies and three senators. In view of this, both opposition caucuses assured that the amount of possible "turncoats" within their parties had been exhausted. For Creemos, Deputy Khaline Moreno reported that "we are more united than ever" after the removal of some of its members. Likewise, Luciana Campero, Rosas' substitute, guaranteed that, of the seventy-eight CC deputies and their substitute, the remaining seventy-six had reached full consensus.

According to political analyst Hugo San Martín, the relative ease with which the MAS achieves the defection of opposition parliamentarians stems from the fact that "ideological parties" have become "practically non-existent" since the collapse of the traditional political parties in the early 2000s. San Martín asserts that "opposition parties are generated at the influx of elections", leading to "improvised people, who come to parliament and are free thinkers". Political analyst Gregorio Lanza agreed, stating that the co-option of opposition deputies into the MAS had origins in the "fundamentally electoral" formation of the opposition, established for purposes of running in elections and "not united by ideas and vision of the country". He also pointed to the general issue of corruption in the country as a compounding factor. For CC Deputy Toribia Lero, instances of political transfuge result in the "weakening of the little democracy that remains in the country" by keeping the legislature "submissive and obedient". On the other hand, Vice Minister Jorge Silva—a member of the MAS—argues that the opposition "cannot blame the MAS" because it "is going to make the most advisable political decision" when presented with the opportunity.

The agitation of the deputies following the election carried into the following day when President Arce delivered his management report after one year in office. The majority of his speech was largely drowned out by shouts for and against him by different legislators, with some members of the opposition raising banners and blowing whistles in protest. Shortly after the session, MAS deputy Héctor Arce accused his colleague from Creemos, Tatiana Áñez, of grabbing and scratching his neck when he tried to stop her from moving to the front to interrupt the president. She, in turn, accused him of grabbing her arm and punching her in the stomach.

Sessions shutting out opposition

Military promotions 
In December 2021, the Senate attempted to address two draft regulations related to the Armed Forces. The first was Chamber Resolution 004/2021–2022, ratifying a series of military promotions issued by President Arce. The second was Chamber Resolution 005/2021–2022, which ratified the promotions of military personnel that occurred in 1989 and 1990 but precluded those issued in 1987 and 1988. Such laws necessitated the support of two-thirds of the legislators present. The opposition refused to approve the regulations, stating that they contained payroll modifications that contravened the Organic Law of the Armed Forces. They asked that the relevant documents be reviewed to ensure that they were in accordance with the list of promotions originally sent to the Senate in 2019. On 21 December, the MAS attempted twice in vain to install a reserved session to approve the list of promotions sent by the executive. In both cases, the ruling party achieved twenty-two votes in favor—the entire MAS caucus plus one unidentified opposition senator—failing to reach the required twenty-four vote majority by just two votes. As a result, the issue was postponed until January of the following year.

The 43rd Regular Session of the Senate was scheduled for 9:00 a.m. on 20 January 2022. On that occasion, four CC senators—Andrea Barrientos, Javier Martínez, Daly Santa María, and Fernando Vaca—ran late for various reasons. Upon arriving, they were informed that in their absence, the MAS had achieved the necessary two-thirds to install a reserved session, and they were thus prohibited from entering the hemicycle. Barrientos decried the session as "forced and illegitimate", pointing out that no part of the Senate Regulations establish that senators may be precluded from entering a reserved session once it has begun. Senator Santa María stated that she and her colleagues had arrived at or around 9:20 a.m. but had nonetheless been locked out of the Senate despite having a half-hour grace period. Given the absence of the four opposition senators, the MAS passed the questioned military promotion regulations with the support of two-thirds of the legislators present. Following the session, President of the Senate Andrónico Rodríguez assured that no irregularities had occurred. He pointed out that one MAS senator had also been excluded from the session for the same reason.

Ethics Commission II 
The following month, a similar situation occurred in the Chamber of Deputies. On 17 February 2022, the chamber installed a session to renew the membership of the Ethics Commission. Though majorities in both CC and Creemos presented their own lists of candidates, dissidents from both blocs presented themselves instead. Of these was Keyla Ortiz, the only opposition dissident who failed to gain a position on the Chamber of Deputies' directorate the previous year. Deputy Carlos Alarcón denounced that for this, the MAS "owed [her] a favor" and that they intended to elect her to the commission, though the ruling party denied that that was the case. Regardless, the session quickly devolved into protests, shouts, and shoves. Among the complainants was Deputy José Carlos Gutiérrez of Creemos. He denounced that in the previous year, most of the twenty-seven complaints sent to the commission were against members of the MAS, but they were all rejected with the support of the dissident Omar Rueda. In contrast, all complaints against opposition deputies were accepted. This accusation provoked a shouting match between Gutiérrez and Rueda, in which the latter challenged Gutiérrez to a brawl: "Let's go outside, let's go outside. I'm going to teach you respect...". In another instance, Deputy Luciana Campero of CC denounced that her MAS colleague Gloria Callizaya had grabbed her from behind while she was protesting at the front of the hemicycle. The lack of order forced President Mamani to suspend the session for a later date.

The session reconvened on 21 February in a process condemned as "rigged" by the opposition. Alarcón denounced that its installation had been called just fifteen minutes in advance, making it impossible for a large part of the opposition to arrive from their respective departments. In response, Deputy Gualberto Arispe of the MAS noted that the previous session had only been intermediately suspended and could thus have been reinstated "at any moment". The few present opposition legislators boycotted the session in protest, leaving the MAS to approve the conformation of the Ethics Commission. No members of the opposition were selected, with dissidents Ortiz of CC and Caero of Creemos being elected to the commission.

Ombudsman election 

The Constitution delegates the task of appointing a new ombudsman to the Legislative Assembly. Crucially, the selection process necessitates two-thirds support from both chambers of the legislature; that is, the MAS could not elect a new official without opposition support. In January 2019, incumbent ombudsman David Tezanos Pinto resigned, leaving Nadia Cruz as the acting authority, a position that by 2022 she had maintained for more than three years. Cruz's tenure had been criticized by the opposition, who alleged that she carried a partisan bias in favor of the MAS. Since the inauguration of Arce, they had pushed for the legislature to call an election to appoint a new authority.

On 25 February 2022, the MAS presented a draft bill to initiate the selection and appointment process of the ombudsman. In a marathon session on 5 March, the majority-MAS Mixed Commission of the Legislative Constitution approved the regulations to initiate the selection process. Although the MAS took into account some adjustments suggested by the opposition, they were nonetheless criticized for presenting a draft regulation that gave the Mixed Commission complete control over the pre-selection of prospective candidates. Legal analysts agreed that since the MAS controlled the commission, it would only approve MAS-aligned candidates to be presented before the full legislature.

On 9 March, the Senate and Chamber of Deputies installed a legislative session to approve the regulations and issue the call for a new ombudsman. As soon as the session began, CC Senator Silvia Salame of Chuquisaca raised a preliminary motion to establish that the regulation face the approval of two-thirds of the Legislative Assembly. Salame argued that since the Constitution states that the election of the ombudsman requires two-thirds support, necessarily the regulation must also be approved by that amount. Vice President Choquehuanca initially rejected this and asked that the draft bill be read. However, Salame insisted that parliamentary rules dictated that her motion be considered first. To this, Choquehuanca conceded, and he put the motion up for consideration.

The subsequent events were described as "embarrassing" by multiple media outlets. The debate on Salame's motion erupted into general disorder, with shouts and whistles, as well as physical confrontations between legislators. In one incident, Deputy Nogales of CC entered into an argument with Deputy Tania Paniagua of the MAS in which Senator Barrientos of CC also intervened to separate the two, culminating in Nogales being thrown to the ground. Barrientos subsequently made her way to the front of the hemicycle to demand that the vice president suspend the session, but was also met with blows by Paniagua and two other assemblywomen. The quarrel forced Choquehuanca to immediately close the session for the day and summon caucus leaders to impose order over their subordinate parliamentarians.

Together with the vice president, caucus leaders met to discuss a solution to the legislative impasse on 14 March. After some hours of negotiations, leaders from all three caucuses announced that they had reached consensus and would reconvene the legislative session the following day. The amended draft regulation excluded multiple provisions, including those that expanded the power of the Mixed Commission to pre-select candidates. Alarcón of CC and Gutiérrez of Creemos both assured that their caucuses would support the bill. The following day, legislators unanimously passed the bill calling for the election of a new ombudsman.

Party summary

Leadership 
The Bolivian Constitution designates the vice president as president of the Plurinational Legislative Assembly. The Constitution also calls for a president of the Chamber of Senators and of the Chamber of Deputies, to serve as the presiding officer over their respective bodies. Each body's general regulations defines a Chamber Directive Board elected each year from among its full members by an absolute majority of those present, respecting gender equity criteria. In the Senate, this directive is composed of a president, first vice president, second vice president, first secretary, second secretary, and third secretary. General regulations assert that the presidency, first vice presidency, and the first and third secretariats correspond to the majority bloc; and the second vice presidency and second secretariat correspond to the minority bloc. In the Chamber of Deputies, the directive is composed of a president, first vice president, second vice president, first secretary, second secretary, third secretary, and fourth secretary. General regulations assert that the presidency, first vice presidency, and the first and second secretariats correspond to the majority bloc; and the second vice presidency and the third and fourth secretariats correspond to the minority bloc.

Composition

Senate 
All thirty-six seats and thirty-six substitutes were filled by election in October 2020. This legislative term marks the first time in Bolivian history in which women make up a majority of the Senate's composition. Of the thirty-six seats, twenty correspond to women, that is, 55.5 percent of the chamber. In individual party caucuses, women make up ten of the twenty-one MAS senators (47.6 percent), eight of the eleven from CC (72.7 percent), and two of the four from Creemos (fifty percent). This result is due to the fact that the three political organizations that achieved Senate representation predominantly placed women at the top of their electoral lists.

Thirty-four titular senators were sworn in on 3 November 2020, with the remaining two, Hilarión Mamani and Pedro Benjamín Vargas, being sworn in the following day. All but one of the thirty-six substitute senators were sworn in six days later on 9 November. Zvonko Matkovic did not arrive to take the oath until 19 November.

Chamber of Deputies 
All 130 seats as well as 129 substitutes were filled by election in October 2020. The titular deputies were sworn in on 3 November 2020 and their substitutes took office two days later on 5 November.

See also 
 2020 Bolivian general election (elections leading to this Assembly)
 2025 Bolivian general election (elections during this Assembly, leading to the next Assembly)

References

Notes

Footnotes

External links 
 Individual data at #Protagonistas .
 Cumulative data at #Protagonistas .

2020 in Bolivia
2021 in Bolivia
2022 in Bolivia
2023 in Bolivia
2024 in Bolivia
2025 in Bolivia
Bolivia
Current
Political history of Bolivia